It Takes All Kinds may refer to:

It Takes All Kinds (film), 1969 film
It Takes All Kinds, series 1 episode 3 of All Creatures Great and Small, see List of All Creatures Great and Small episodes
It Takes All Kinds, series 5 episode 1 of The Liver Birds
It Takes All Kinds, 1986 poetry collection by Raymond Souster
It Takes All Kinds, song by Sly and the Family Stone from the 1979 album Back on the Right Track
It Takes All Kinds, song from the album Bachelor No. 2 or, the Last Remains of the Dodo by Aimee Mann

See also
It Takes All Kinds of People (disambiguation)